Hugh Kernohan (born 2 July 1958) is a British fencer. He competed in the individual épée event at the 1988 Summer Olympics. In 1989, he won the épée title at the British Fencing Championships.

His father is the Scottish writer and broadcaster Robert Deans Kernohan.

References

External links
 

1958 births
Living people
British male fencers
Olympic fencers of Great Britain
Fencers at the 1988 Summer Olympics
Sportspeople from Glasgow